James Michael Peterik (born November 11, 1950) is an American musician and songwriter. He is best known as the founder of the rock band Survivor, as vocalist and songwriter of "Vehicle" by the Ides of March, and as co-writer of the anthem "Eye of the Tiger", the theme from the 1982 film Rocky III.

Peterik has co-written songs for 38 Special ("Rockin' into the Night",, "Hold On Loosely and "Caught Up in You"), Lynyrd Skynyrd, Blackhawk, Cheap Trick, Sammy Hagar ("Heavy Metal"), Cathy Richardson, Dennis DeYoung, Van Zant, Brian Wilson, REO Speedwagon, and The Beach Boys. He is currently fronting the band Pride of Lions, and an entire album of women of Rock and Roll called Tigress and smooth jazz project Jim Peterik's Lifeforce, and has a regular series of yearly concert performances with an all-star cast as World Stage. He is also active as a producer and mentor to young, developing talent.

Career

The Ides of March and early years 
Peterik started performing in 1964 with some of his schoolmates in Berwyn, Illinois, as The Ides of March. Their hits included "You Wouldn't Listen", "Vehicle", and "L.A. Goodbye" in the late 1960s and early 1970s. "Vehicle", which was number 2 on the Billboard Hot 100 chart the week of May 23, 1970, is purported to be the fastest selling single in Warner Bros. Records history.

Peterik graduated from Morton West High School in 1968 and Morton Junior College in 1970, and attended college classes while "Vehicle" became a national hit.

In the early 1970s Peterik wrote several songs recorded by the jazz-rock band Chase and performed on their 1974 album Pure Music. In 1976 he released a solo album, Don't Fight the Feeling, and toured as the Jim Peterik Band with Bruce Gaitsch (guitar), Terry Fryer (keyboards), and Chase's rhythm section of Dennis Keith Johnson (bass) and Gary Smith (drums). They toured with several of the era's most popular bands, including Heart and Boston.

Survivor 
In 1978, the Jim Peterik Band had broken up and Peterik was considering going back to singing and producing jingles. After several days of pleading with Peterik, road manager/sound man Rick Weigand persuaded him to meet with guitarist Frankie Sullivan. Within an hour of that first meeting, the band Survivor was born.

In the early years of Survivor, Peterik continued to co-write hits for other artists, including 38 Special and Sammy Hagar. In 1982, Sylvester Stallone commissioned Survivor to write and perform the theme song for Rocky III. This song, "Eye of the Tiger", became their defining single, spending six weeks at No. 1 on the Billboard Hot 100 and going double platinum. "Eye of the Tiger" also won a Grammy Award and resulted in an Oscar nomination for Peterik and Frankie Sullivan for Best Song.

Their 1984 album, Vital Signs, featured the Top 10 hits "High on You" (No. 8) and "The Search Is Over" (No. 4), and another sizable hit, "I Can't Hold Back" (No. 13). In 1985, Peterik co-wrote the theme song to Rocky IV, "Burning Heart", which would be another big hit (No. 2 in early 1986) for Survivor. "Burning Heart" was followed by Number 7 hit, "Is This Love".

Following Survivor's 1988 album Too Hot to Sleep, the group disbanded.

Songs from each of Peterik's bands appear in Stallone films to motivate the scene's action: Survivor's "Eye of the Tiger" in Rocky III, the Ides of March's "Vehicle" in Lock Up, and Jimi Jamison's solo take on Survivor's "Ever Since the World Began" playing during the closing credits of Lock Up.

In 1993, Peterik once again began touring and recording with a reunited Survivor, but left them for good in July 1996.

Later years 
In 1990, the original members of the Ides of March (Peterik, Millas, Bob Bergland, Mike Borch, Chuck Soumar, and John Larson) reunited, adding new members Scott May and Dave Stahlberg. This lineup continues to perform. Peterik continues to write for other artists such as the Doobie Brothers and Cheap Trick.

In 2001, Peterik produced and co-wrote the first album by AOR group Mecca with his longtime friend Joe Vana.

In 2003, he founded Pride of Lions with Toby Hitchcock. The group, according to Peterik is "my vision of the best elements of the great melodic rock era of the 80s, updated of course with more modern production sounds." Peterik continues to play with the Ides of March. As well, a solo CD, Above the Storm, was released in 2006.

"Vehicle" found new popularity when it was performed by American Idol runner-up Bo Bice in 2005.

Peterik performed at the West Australian Music Industry Awards with shred virtuoso Michael Angelo Batio in 2005.

In 2009, Peterik appeared on The Jerry Springer Show as guest security.

In 2010, Peterik backed up the Louisiana State University Tiger Marching Band in their final halftime show of the season, at the LSU vs. Ole Miss game.

In April 2011, Peterik played a sold-out run of eight nights at the Pioneer Place Theater as a special guest of the Fabulous Armadillos in St. Cloud, Minnesota. In October 2011, he returned with the Fabulous Armadillos for a sold-out night at the Paramount Theatre, St. Cloud, Minnesota.

Peterik also develops and produces new talent on his own label, World Stage International. Current artists, aside from Lifeforce, include Marc Scherer, Hunter Cook, and the trio Ariel, Zoey & Eli. Past artists include Lisa McClowry and Mallory Lennon. World Stage has two recording studios, engineered by the Ides of March co-founder and Peterik's childhood friend, Larry Millas.

In 2012, Peterik co-wrote and made an appearance on the Beach Boys' reunion album, That's Why God Made the Radio. He previously worked with Beach Boys founder Brian Wilson on Wilson's 1998 solo album, Imagination.

In 2014, Peterik released his autobiography, Through The Eye Of The Tiger, co-written with Lisa Torem, on BenBella Books, and traveled internationally to sign books on tour.

In 2016, Peterik released The Songs, an album of some of his biggest songs, re-arranged as acoustic/roots versions. The album was produced by Fred Mollin and was recorded both in Nashville, TN and at his home studio in Illinois.

On May 5, 2019, he appeared on MeTV's Collector's Call with Lisa Whelchel, showing off part of his collection of 193 guitars.

Peterik resides in Western Springs, Illinois.

Discography

Solo 
 Don't Fight the Feeling (1976)
 Above the Storm (2006)
 The Songs (2016)

Songs with Chase 
 "Boys and Girls Together" (1971)
 "Love Is on the Way" (1974)
 "Run Back to Mama" (1974)
 "Pure Music" (1974) (unreleased)

With The Ides of March 
Vehicle (1970)
Common Bond (1971)
World Woven (1972)
Midnight Oil (1973)
Still 19 (2010)
Last Band Standing (box set) (2015)
Outside the Box (select tracks from "Last Band Standing") (2016)
Play On (2019)

With Henry Paul Band 
 Feel the Heat (1980)
 Anytime (1981)

With Survivor 
 Survivor (1979)
 Premonition (1981)
 Eye of the Tiger (1982)
 Caught in the Game (1983)
 Vital Signs (1984)
 When Seconds Count (1986)
 Too Hot to Sleep (1988)

With World Stage 
 Jim Peterik and the World Stage (2000)
 Rock America: Smash Hits Live (2002)
 Winds of Change (2019)
 Tigress – Women Who Rock the World (2021)

With Kelly Keagy 
 Time Passes (2001)
 I'm Alive (2007)

With Pride of Lions 
Pride of Lions (2003)
Sound of Home (2003)
Black Ribbons (Voices of the World) (2003)
The Destiny Stone (2004)
Live in Belgium (2006)
The Roaring of Dreams (2007)
Immortal (2012)
Fearless (2017)
Lion Heart (2020)

With Jim Peterik's Lifeforce 
 Lifeforce (2009)
 Forces at Play (2011)

With Jimi Jamison 
 Crossroads Moment (2008)
 Extra Moments (2010)

With Marc Scherer 
 Risk Everything (2015)

With Marc Scherer and Jennifer Batten as Scherer/Batten 
 BattleZone (2017)

Books 
Peterik co-authored Songwriting for Dummies, published 2002, with Dave Austin and Mary Ellen Bickford. His autobiography, Through the Eye of the Tiger, co-written with Lisa Torem, was released by BenBella Books in September 2014.

References

External links 

Official website

Jim Peterick – Nakedly Examined Music Podcast (2020)
Jim Peterik Interview honoring Jimi Jamison, from August 2015 with Pods & Sods
Jim Peterik Interview NAMM Oral History Library (2018)

1950 births
Living people
American rock keyboardists
American rock guitarists
American male guitarists
American male singers
American rock singers
People from Berwyn, Illinois
Singers from Chicago
American people of Slovak descent
American people of Russian descent
Survivor (band) members
People from Burr Ridge, Illinois
Songwriters from Illinois
Guitarists from Chicago
20th-century American guitarists
20th-century American male musicians
20th-century American keyboardists
Frontiers Records artists
American male songwriters